The area is popular, mostly in the summer months, with local families, holidaymakers, picnickers, horseriders, ramblers, metal detectors, dogwalkers and the occasional kite buggy.  The shallow bay is a popular watersports location for windsurfers, kitesurfers and sea kayaks.

Many sea and wading birds frequent the area making it a regular haven for bird-watchers. A small community of rare water voles are known to reside around the several burns running out of the bents. Grey seals are often spotted to the west of the bay.

The area is part of the Firth of Forth Site of Special Scientific Interest, a Special Protection Area and Ramsar Site.

There are three car-parking areas, and the largest (No. 3) has good views west across the bay to Edinburgh's skyline and the Forth Bridge and Forth Road Bridge. Overnight parking is prohibited.

Close to car park No.3 is Gosford House, and one of its two listed 18th century lodges can be seen on the main road.

Longniddry Bents are part of the John Muir Way coastal walk and were presented with a Seaside Award (Rural) in 2006.

In the East Lothian Council-produced series of leaflets on the John Muir Way, Longniddry is included in the leaflet "Cockenzie to Aberlady". The John Muir way is also part of the North Sea Trail of seven nations and 26 areas around the North Sea.

See also
Longniddry Primary School
Longniddry railway station
List of places in East Lothian
Bents, Saskatchewan a ghost town named after Longniddry Bents

References

External links
East Lothian Council's webpage on Longniddry Bents
City of Edinburgh page on Longniddry bents
VisitScotland's webpage on Longniddry Bents

Landforms of East Lothian
Longniddry
Beaches of Scotland